Vasu Duzhiy (born Nikolai Duzhiy, 1965) is an ultra-distance runner from St. Petersburg, Russia. Duzhiy is a disciple of Sri Chinmoy and adopted the name Vasu from him. He works as a foreman for a lumber company.

Races and Results 
 2018 winner from the Self-Transcendence 3100 Mile Race
 2017 winner from the Self-Transcendence 3100 Mile Race
 2013 winner from the Self-Transcendence 3100 Mile Race
 2012 second on the Self-Transcendence 10 Day Race

References

External links 
 Video : 3100-Mile Race, 2017
 Video : 3100-Mile Race, 2014
 Video : 3100-Mile Race, 2012

1965 births
Living people
Russian ultramarathon runners
Devotees of Sri Chinmoy
Athletes from Saint Petersburg
Male ultramarathon runners
Russian male long-distance runners
Date of birth missing (living people)
Place of birth missing (living people)
21st-century Russian people